Brandywine Township is the name of two townships in Indiana:

 Brandywine Township, Hancock County, Indiana
 Brandywine Township, Shelby County, Indiana

Indiana township disambiguation pages